Milena Quaglini (March 25, 1957 – October 16, 2001) was an Italian woman, who in the late 1990s murdered three men who tried to rape her.

Biography 
Quaglini was born in 1957 in Mezzanino, near Broni in the Oltrepò Pavese.

After graduating as an accountant in Pavia, at 19 she ran away from home to live between Como and Lodi, working occasionally as a cashier, caregiver and cleaning lady. She married and had a son, but her husband became seriously ill with fulminant diabetes and died, causing her to fall into a depression that would accompany her throughout her life, also beginning to drink. Quaglini moved to live in Travacò Siccomario, and after finding a job in San Martino Siccomario, she met Mario Fogli, who would become her second husband. He proved to be an obsessive, closed and jealous alcoholic who occasionally worked as a truck driver. Both Mario and Milena were also activists for the Lega Nord. Quaglini had two sons from him, but when the bailiffs arrived at their house for an attachment of assets because of the husband's debts, she decided to separate from him and move to Este, with her second daughter. In Veneto, she worked as a concierge for a gym.

The money wasn't enough, so Quaglini found work as a caregiver for an elderly gentleman, 83-year-old Giusto Dalla Pozza, who lent her 4 million lires and then tried to blackmail her. On October 25, 1995, Dalla Pozza told Milena that she could repay him 500,000 lires for a month or pay him in another way. When she refused, he tried to rape her. A scuffle broke out, in which Quaglini struck him on the head with a lamp. She then left the house and left the agonized Dalla Pozza, who was still alive, calling an ambulance. He died ten days later. Milena was accused of this murder, and instead was filed as an accidental fall until her confession. For this reason she was sentenced to 20 months imprisonment due to excessive legitimate defense.

Quaglini returned to Broni in attempt to reconcile with her former husband Mario Fogli; but the quarrels started again, with Milena returning to drinking and taking antidepressants. On August 2, 1998, after another quarrel, in a state of strong drunkenness, she killed her husband: she waited for him to fall asleep, put the two girls in bed, then snatched a rope from a shutter and wrapped it around Mario's neck to scare him. This resulted in a scuffle in which Fogli tried in vain to overwhelm her. Quaglini hit him with jewelry box and then strangled him with the shutter rope. She then wrapped her husband's body in the bloodstained blankets and then in a carpet, which she put on the balcony. At 4 PM, she called the Carabinieri 
of Stradella, saying she had killed her husband: the Carabinieri kept her on the phone while she told them the address. After she gave the phone to her daughters, they said with certainty that the carpet with the body was on the balcony. Milena was arrested, and for this murder was sentenced to six years and eight months, also selling her house because her sentence was reduced due to her semi-insanity. Quaglini was sent to a recovery community for alcoholics, but after a few months she started drinking again. She was taken into a new community, where she met a former carabiniere named Salvatore, who offered her hospitality, but tried to rape her two days later.

Quaglini met Angelo Porrello through an announcement. On October 5, 1999, she killed him in his home in Bascapè after he told her to dress provocatively, which she refused to do. He then slapped her, and proceeded to rape her three times. After the situation subsided, in the early afternoon she prepared a coffee for him, dissolving 20 tranquilizer tablets into it. Porrello fell asleep, and then Milena moved his body into the bathtub, filling it with water. She returned a few hours later to check on him, and he had drowned. In the evening, she moved the corpse to the garden. Drugs found in the home and DNA traces brought her to confess, after Quaglini was arrested in Porrello's car and returned to prison. On October 20, two weeks after the murder, the corpse was discovered in an advanced stage of decomposition.

Condemned to serve her sentence in the Vigevano Prison, Quaglini tried to overcome her depression by resuming her passion for painting, but she eventually hanged herself with a bed sheet on October 16, 2001. She was found still alive by a guard at 1:50 AM, but she died in the Emergency Room at 2:15 AM.

The story of Milena Quaglini had a dedicated episode on La linea d'ombra with Massimo Picozzi on Rai 2, where her story was compared to that of American serial killer Aileen Wuornos, a prostitute who killed seven clients in Florida. In March 2015, Sky Crime dedicated the first episode of Profondo Nero with Carlo Lucarelli to the story of Milena Quaglini. On April 7, 2016, Rai 3 aired the fourth episode of the fourth season of Black Stars conceived and conducted by Marco Marra, dedicated to Milena Quaglini.

Victims 
 Giusto Dalla Pozza, 83, died in Este on November 4, 1995 following his injuries
 Mario Fogli, 52, killed on August 2, 1998 in Broni
 Angelo Porrello, 53 years old, was killed on October 5, 1999 in Bascapè

See also 
 List of serial killers by country

References

External links 
 Detailed biography of Milena Quaglini, on serialkillers.it
 Biography of the killer on LaTelaNera.com, on latelanera.com
 Documentary on IlDocumento.it, on ildocumento.it
 Article on Panorama.it, on archivio.panorama.it
 Research on killer women (Milena's biography is on page 13)

1957 births
2001 deaths
2001 suicides
Italian female serial killers
Mariticides
People from the Province of Pavia
Serial killers who committed suicide in prison custody
Suicides by hanging in Italy